Antonio Martínez de Meneses (c. 1612 – 1661) was a playwright of the Spanish Golden Age.

1610s births
1661 deaths
Spanish dramatists and playwrights
Spanish male dramatists and playwrights
People from Toledo, Spain